Rockhead was a Canadian hard rock music group formed in 1991 in Vancouver by Bob Rock.

History
Already a well-established music producer, guitarist Bob Rock formed the group in 1991 with his Payola$ and Rock and Hyde bandmate,  drummer Chris Taylor, as well as vocalist Steve Jack and bassist Jamey Koch. Jack and Koch, as well as keyboardist John Webster, were all local Vancouver, British Columbia musicians. Their debut single was called "Heartland". Rock produced the band's debut effort, which was released on Capitol Records in 1992. Members of Bon Jovi, The Cult, and Little Caesar guested on the album. The singles "Bed of Roses" and "Chelsea Rose" followed, as did a tour supporting Bon Jovi. However, the album did not sell well, and soon after the group disbanded and Rock returned to his career in production.

Members
Steve Jack - lead vocals, harmonica
Bob Rock - guitars, backing vocals
Jamey Koch - bass, acoustic guitar, backing vocals
John Webster - keyboards, hammond organ, piano, backing vocals
Chris Taylor - drums

Touring members
David "Ziggy" Sigmund - guitars

Session members
Billy Duffy - guitar (also tour guest)
Richie Sambora - guitar
Jimmy "Apache" Hayne - guitar
Kenny Greer - pedal steel guitar, slide guitar
Marc LaFrance - backing vocals
David Steele - backing vocals
Scott Humphrey - programming

Discography
Rockhead (Capitol Records, 1992)

References

Musical groups established in 1991
Musical groups disestablished in 1993
Musical groups from Vancouver
Canadian hard rock musical groups
1991 establishments in British Columbia
1993 disestablishments in British Columbia